Fang Mountain is a  summit located in the Alaska Range, in Denali National Park and Preserve, in Alaska, United States. This peak's local descriptive name was published in 1952 by the United States Geological Survey. Rarely climbed, Fang Mountain is an unattractive climbing destination because of dangerous, loose, rotten rock and a long approach.

Climate

Based on the Köppen climate classification, Fang Mountain is located in a subarctic climate zone with long, cold, snowy winters, and mild summers. Temperatures can drop below −20 °C with wind chill factors below −30 °C. The months May through June offer the most favorable weather for climbing or viewing. Precipitation runoff from the mountain drains north into Savage River, east into Riley Creek, or west into the Sanctuary River, which are all in the Tanana River drainage basin.

See also

List of mountain peaks of Alaska
Geology of Alaska

References

External links
 Fang Mountain: Mountain Forecast
 Weather forecast: Fang Mountain

Alaska Range
Mountains of Denali Borough, Alaska
Mountains of Denali National Park and Preserve
Mountains of Alaska
North American 2000 m summits